The United States Department of Defense's Office of Net Assessment (ONA) was created in 1973 by Richard Nixon to serve as the Pentagon's "internal think tank" that "looks 20 to 30 years into the military's future, often with the assistance of outside contractors, and produces reports on the results of its research". The Director of Net Assessment is the principal staff assistant and advisor to the Secretary and Deputy Secretary of Defense on net assessment.

According to Defense Directive 5111.11, the Director shall develop and coordinate net assessments of the standing, trends, and future prospects of U.S. military capabilities and military potential in comparison with those of other countries or groups of countries in order to identify emerging or future threats or opportunities for the United States. Paul Bracken explains that it is important to have a good grasp of net assessment because it is an "important part of the language spoken by leaders in the higher levels of DOD" and officers who lack familiarity "will be at a disadvantage in communicating with the civilian leadership".

Andrew Marshall was named its first director, a position he continued to hold under succeeding administrations. In October 2014, Marshall announced plans to retire in January 2015. He was replaced by Jim Baker in May 2015.

List of directors
 Andrew Marshall, 1973 – January 2, 2015
 James H. Baker, May 14, 2015 – Present

Notable staff
Staff members have included:
 David S. Yost
 Andrew F. Krepinevich, Jr., formerly the president of the Center for Strategic and Budgetary Assessments
 Larry Seaquist, recently a member of Washington State's House of Representatives

References

United States Department of Defense agencies
Military units and formations established in 1973
1973 establishments in Washington, D.C.